The second season of the American serial drama television series Lost commenced airing in the United States and Canada on September 21, 2005, and concluded on May 24, 2006. The second season continues the stories of a group of over forty people who have been stranded on a remote island in the south Pacific, after their airplane crashed forty-four days prior to the beginning of the season. The producers have stated that as the first season is about introducing the survivors, the second season is about a 1970s scientific Dharma Initiative research station which the survivors discovered on the island and refer to as "The Hatch".
The second season aired Wednesdays at 9:00 pm in the United States. In addition to the regular twenty-four episodes (with a run time around 42 minutes each), three clip-shows recapped previous events on the show. "Destination Lost" aired before the premiere, "Lost: Revelation" aired before the tenth episode and "Lost: Reckoning" aired before the twentieth episode. The season was released on DVD as a seven disc boxed set under the title of Lost: The Complete Second Season – The Extended Experience on September 5, 2006, by Buena Vista Home Entertainment.

Crew 
The season was produced by Touchstone Television (now ABC Studios), Bad Robot Productions and Grass Skirt Productions and was aired on the ABC Network in the U.S. The executive producers were co-creator J. J. Abrams, co-creator Damon Lindelof, Bryan Burk, Jack Bender and Carlton Cuse. The staff writers were Lindelof, Cuse, co-executive producer Steven Maeda, supervising producer Javier Grillo-Marxuach, supervising producers Edward Kitsis & Adam Horowitz, supervising producer Leonard Dick, supervising producer Jeph Loeb, supervising producer Craig Wright, producer Elizabeth Sarnoff and Christina M. Kim. The regular directors were Bender, producer Stephen Williams, camera operator Paul Edwards and Eric Laneuville. Lindelof and Cuse served as the show runners.

Cast 

The second season had fifteen roles getting star billing, with thirteen of them returning from the first season. The cast are listed in alphabetical order.
 Naveen Andrews portrayed former Iraqi Republican Guard Sayid Jarrah. 
 Emilie de Ravin played new mother Claire Littleton. 
 Matthew Fox acted as Dr. Jack Shephard, the leader of the survivors. 
 Jorge Garcia portrayed unlucky and mentally unstable millionaire Hugo "Hurley" Reyes, who often serves as comic relief. 
 Maggie Grace played Shannon Rutherford, still recovering from the recent death of her brother Boone.
 Josh Holloway acted as con man James "Sawyer" Ford. 
 Malcolm David Kelley, who portrayed Walt Lloyd, Michael's son, only received star billing in the episodes in which he appeared.
 Daniel Dae Kim acted as non-English speaking Jin Kwon. 
 Yunjin Kim played Sun Kwon, Jin's English-speaking wife. 
 Evangeline Lilly portrayed fugitive Kate Austen. 
 Dominic Monaghan acted as rock star and recovering drug addict Charlie Pace.  
 Terry O'Quinn played "man of faith" John Locke. 
 Harold Perrineau portrayed Michael Dawson, whose son was kidnapped by the Others.
 Michelle Rodriguez portrayed the leader of the tail section survivors, police officer Ana-Lucia Cortez. 
 Adewale Akinnuoye-Agbaje played former drug lord-turned priest, Mr. Eko. 
 Cynthia Watros played tail-section survivor Libby. 

Former main cast member Ian Somerhalder returned with special guest star billing as Boone Carlyle.

The second season featured numerous guest stars. Michael Emerson portrayed a man calling himself Henry Gale, who is suspected to be one of the Others, a group of mysterious island inhabitants who terrorize the survivors. L. Scott Caldwell returned to play Rose Henderson, while Sam Anderson joined the cast playing her husband, Bernard Nadler. Kimberley Joseph returns as flight attendant Cindy, having appeared in the pilot episode. Henry Ian Cusick portrayed Desmond Hume, a man who had been living in the hatch for three years. M. C. Gainey played the Other named Tom and Tania Raymonde played the Other named Alex. John Terry appeared in numerous flashbacks as Jack's father, Christian Shephard. François Chau appeared in orientation films for the Dharma Initiative. Clancy Brown acted as Desmond's companion in the hatch, Kelvin Inman. Katey Sagal appeared throughout the season as Helen, Locke's love interest who gets caught between his pugnacious relationship with his father.

Reception 
On Rotten Tomatoes, the season has an approval rating of 100% with an average score of 9.2 out of 10 based on 12 reviews. The website's critical consensus reads, "This sophomore season goes smoothly down the hatch, deepening both the mysteries of the island and the depth of its castaways."

The season was nominated for nine Emmy Awards, but did not win any. Nominations included Carlton Cuse and Damon Lindelof for Outstanding Writing for a Drama Series for "The 23rd Psalm"; Jack Bender for Outstanding Directing for a Drama Series for "Live Together, Die Alone"; Henry Ian Cusick for Outstanding Guest Actor in a Drama Series; Michael Bonvillain for Outstanding Cinematography for a Single-Camera Series for "Man of Science, Man of Faith"; two nominations for Outstanding Single-Camera Picture Editing for a Drama Series; Outstanding Casting for a Drama Series; Outstanding Single-Camera Sound Mixing for a Series; and Outstanding Special Visual Effects for a Series.

The season was nominated for three Golden Globe Awards: Matthew Fox for lead actor, Naveen Andrews for supporting actor, while it won the award for best drama.

The DVD set entered the sales chart at the number one position in its first week of release, selling 500,000 copies in the first day. The season premiere hit a ratings high for the series, with 23.47 million American viewers. Overall, the season averaged 18.91 million American viewers.

Episodes 

The "No. in series" column refers to the episode's number within the overall series, whereas the "No. in season" column refers to the episode's number within this particular season. "Featured character(s)" refers to the character(s), whose back story is featured in the episode's flashbacks. "U.S. viewers (million)" refers to the number of viewers in the United States in millions who watched the episode as it was aired.

Home media release 
The second season was released as a widescreen seven-disc Region 1 DVD box set in the on September 5, 2006, and in United Kingdom on October 2, 2006, titled as Lost: The Complete Second Season – The Extended Experience. Each of these releases also contain extras, including behind the scenes footage, deleted scenes, audio commentaries, and a "Lost Connections" chart, which shows how all of the characters on the island are inter-connected with each other. The season was subsequently released on Blu-ray Disc on June 16, 2009.

The series was initially released in two sets in United Kingdom: the first twelve episodes were released as a widescreen four-disc DVD box set on July 17, 2006. The remaining episodes of the second season were released as a four-disc DVD box set on October 2, 2006. The set was released in Region 4 on October 4, 2006.

References

External links 

List of Lost season 2 episodes at Lostpedia

Lost (TV series)
2005 American television seasons
2006 American television seasons